Pensekhmet was a vizier of ancient Egypt. He served during the reign of Merenptah.

References

Ancient Egyptian viziers
Nineteenth Dynasty of Egypt